Phaeostigma  is a Palaearctic genus of snakeflies in the family Raphidiidae.

Species
The following are included in BioLib.cz:<ref name=Biolib>[https://www.biolib.cz/en/taxon/id104428/ BioLib.cz: "Phaeostigma Navás, 1909  (retrieved 6 September 2021)]</ref>
subgenus Aegeoraphidia Aspöck & Rausch, 1991
 Phaeostigma biroi (Navás, 1915)
 Phaeostigma karpathana U. Aspöck & H. Aspöck, 1989
 Phaeostigma noane (H. Aspöck & U. Aspöck, 1966)
 Phaeostigma propheticum (H. Aspöck & U. Aspöck, 1964)
 Phaeostigma raddai (U. Aspöck & H. Aspöck, 1970)
 Phaeostigma remane (H. Aspöck et al., 1976)
 Phaeostigma ressli (H. Aspöck & U. Aspöck, 1964)
 Phaeostigma vartianorum (H. Aspöck & U. Aspöck, 1965)
subgenus Caucasoraphidia Aspöck & Aspöck, 1968
 Phaeostigma caucasicum (Esben-Petersen, 1913)
 Phaeostigma resslianum (H. Aspöck & U. Aspöck, 1970)
subgenus Crassoraphidia Aspöck & Aspöck, 1968
 Phaeostigma cypricum (Hagen, 1867)
 Phaeostigma klimeschiellum H. Aspöck et al., 1982
 Phaeostigma knappi (H. Aspöck & U. Aspöck, 1967)
subgenus Graecoraphidia Aspöck & Aspöck, 1968
 Phaeostigma albarda Rausch & H. Aspöck, 1991
 Phaeostigma divinum (H. Aspöck & U. Aspöck, 1964)
 Phaeostigma hoelzeli (H. Aspöck & U. Aspöck, 1964)
subgenus Magnoraphidia Aspöck & Aspöck, 1968
 Phaeostigma flammi (H. Aspöck & U. Aspöck, 1973)
 Phaeostigma horticolum (H. Aspöck & U. Aspöck, 1973)
 Phaeostigma klimeschi (H. Aspöck & U. Aspöck, 1964)
 Phaeostigma major (Burmeister, 1839)
 Phaeostigma robustum (H. Aspöck & U. Aspöck, 1966)
 Phaeostigma wewalkai (H. Aspöck & U. Aspöck, 1971)
subgenus Miroraphidia Aspöck & Aspöck, 1968
 Phaeostigma curvatulum (H. Aspöck & U. Aspöck, 1964)
subgenus Phaeostigma Navás, 1909
 Phaeostigma euboicum (H. Aspöck & U. Aspöck, 1976)
 Phaeostigma galloitalicum (H. Aspöck & U. Aspöck, 1976)
 Phaeostigma italogallicum (H. Aspöck & U. Aspöck, 1976)
 Phaeostigma notata (Fabricius, 1781)
 Phaeostigma pilicollis (Stein, 1863)
 Phaeostigma promethei H. Aspöck et al., 1983
subgenus Pontoraphidia Aspöck & Aspöck, 1968
 Phaeostigma grandii (Principi, 1960)
 Phaeostigma ponticum (Albarda, 1891)
 Phaeostigma rhodopicum (Klapálek, 1894)
 Phaeostigma setulosum (H. Aspöck & U. Aspöck, 1967)
subgenus Superboraphidia Aspöck & Aspöck, 1968
 Phaeostigma auberti (H. Aspöck & U. Aspöck, 1966)
 Phaeostigma mammaphilum (H. Aspöck & U. Aspöck, 1974)
 Phaeostigma minois U. Aspöck & H. Aspöck, 1990
 Phaeostigma rauschi (H. Aspöck & U. Aspöck, 1970)
 Phaeostigma turcicum (H. Aspöck et al., 1981)
Unplaced species
 Phaeostigma holzingeri Rausch & H. Aspöck, 1993
 Phaeostigma longicaudum (Stein, 1863) (Phaeostigma longicauda ?)
 Phaeostigma major (Burmeister, 1839)
 Phaeostigma thaleri'' (H. Aspöck & U. Aspöck, 1964)

References

External Links
 
 

Raphidioptera